Mehti Sarakham (born 21 May 1999) is a Thai professional footballer who plays as a forward for Thai League 1 club  PT Prachuap.

Honours

International
Thailand U-23
 Southeast Asian Games  Silver medal: 2021

References

External links
 

1999 births
Living people
Mehti Sarakham
Mehti Sarakham
Association football forwards
Mehti Sarakham
Mehti Sarakham
Mehti Sarakham
Competitors at the 2021 Southeast Asian Games
Mehti Sarakham